The 1984–85 Alpha Ethniki was the 49th season of the highest football league of Greece. The season began on 23 September 1984 and ended on 16 June 1985. PAOK won their second Greek title and their first one in nine years.

The point system was: Win: 2 points - Draw: 1 point.

League table

Results

Top scorers

External links
Official Greek FA Site
RSSSF
Greek SuperLeague official Site
SuperLeague Statistics

Alpha Ethniki seasons
Greece
1